Codd is a surname. Notable people with the surname include:

 Bernard Codd (died 2013), English motorcycle racer
 Edgar F. Codd (1923–2003), British computer scientist
 Frederick Codd (1832–), English Gothic revival architect
 Hiram Codd (1838–1887), English engineer who invented and patented the Codd Bottle
 Leslie Codd (1908–1999), South African botanist
 Mike Codd (1939–), former senior Australian public servant

See also
 Cod (disambiguation)
 Codd-neck bottle
 Codd's 12 rules